The 2013–14 Slovenian Basketball League, also known as the 2013–14 Telemach League due to sponsorship reasons, was the 23rd season of the Premier A Slovenian Basketball League, the highest professional basketball league in Slovenia. Krka won its seventh national championship, and its fifth in a row.

Regular season

|}

Second round

Group A

|}

Group B
Results between teams in the regular season remained in effect for the second round for Group B.

|}

Playoffs

Relegation Playoffs

The two bottom teams of the season played against the two best teams from the Slovenian Second Division. All teams played each other at home and away.

|}

Awards

Regular Season MVP
 Hugh Robertson (Hopsi Polzela)

Season MVP
 Ousman Krubally (Grosuplje)

Finals MVP
 Jaka Klobučar (Krka Novo Mesto)

Weekly MVP

Regular season

Note

 – Co-MVP's were announced.

Second round

Statistical leaders

| width=50% valign=top |

Points

|}
|}

| width=50% valign=top |

Assists

|}
|}

References

Slovenian Basketball League seasons
Slovenia
1